Sitaris is a genus of beetles belonging to the family Meloidae.

The species of this genus are found in Europe and Mediterranean.

Species:

Sitaris emiliae 
Sitaris melanurus 
Sitaris muralis 
Sitaris rufipennis 
Sitaris rufiventris 
Sitaris solieri 
Sitaris tauricus

References

Meloidae